Daniel Mladenov (born 25 May 1987) is a Bulgarian professional footballer who plays as a winger for Etar Veliko Tarnovo.

Career

Youth career
Mladenov started his career in his home town Kyustendil in the local team, Velbazhd.

Marek Dupnitsa
In June 2007, Mladenov signed a contract for three years with Marek Dupnitsa.

Pirin Blagoevgrad
One year later, in 2008, Daniel signed with PFC Pirin Blagoevgrad.

Levski Sofia
On 9 June 2010, he signed his 3-year contract. On 30 June 2010, he made his unofficial debut for Levski in a match against FCM Târgu Mureş. Mladenov entered the match as a substitute and scored 2 goals.

Mladenov officially debuted for Levski in a Europa League match against Dundalk F.C. The Blues won the first match and the result was 6:0. Mladenov scored two of the goals.

On 16 December 2010, Mladenov netted the only goal (right at the end of the first half) for Levski Sofia in the 1:0 home win against Sporting CP in the final UEFA Europa League match of the group phase. However, the team from Sofia had already been eliminated from the competition.

Chernomorets Burgas
On 3 August 2012, he signed a 2-year contract with Chernomorets Burgas for free. On 13 December, he was arrested for illegal betting. Three days later he was released from the club. However, he did not face any legal charges.

PFC Montana
In February 2013, Montana acquired the services of Mladenov until the end of the 2012/13 A PFG season. At the end of season his contract had expired.

Marek Dupnitsa
On 2 June 2013 Mladenov played one match for Marek Dupnitsa in the amateur V Group against Slivnishki geroi and scored a goal.

Cherno More Varna
On 5 June 2013 he was signed by Cherno More.

International career
Mladenov earned his first cap for Bulgaria on 7 September 2019, coming on as a late second-half substitute for Galin Ivanov in the 0:4 away loss against England in a UEFA Euro 2020 qualifier.

Career statistics
Updated 30 May 2012.

References

External links
 Mladenov at Levski's site
 Daniel Mladenov Facts
 Daniel Mladenov at Etarvt.bg
 
 

1987 births
Living people
Bulgarian footballers
Bulgaria international footballers
Bulgaria under-21 international footballers
First Professional Football League (Bulgaria) players
PFC Velbazhd Kyustendil players
PFC Marek Dupnitsa players
PFC Pirin Blagoevgrad players
PFC Levski Sofia players
PFC Chernomorets Burgas players
FC Montana players
PFC Cherno More Varna players
FC Oborishte players
FC Septemvri Simitli players
OFC Pirin Blagoevgrad players
SFC Etar Veliko Tarnovo players
FC CSKA 1948 Sofia players
Association football wingers
People from Kyustendil
Sportspeople from Kyustendil Province